Mário Esteves Coluna (6 August 1935 – 25 February 2014) was a Portuguese footballer who played mainly as a central midfielder.

He spent most of his career with Benfica, appearing in 525 official matches and scoring 127 goals during 16 professional seasons. Dubbed O Monstro Sagrado (The Sacred Monster), he won 19 major titles with his main club, including ten national leagues and two European Cups.

Coluna represented Portugal at the 1966 World Cup and earned a total of 57 caps. He was considered one of the best midfielders of his generation, also being viewed as one of the most talented Portuguese players of all time, noted for his long-time Benfica and Portugal national team captaincy with leadership qualities, calm demeanor and respectful conduct, as well as his vision and reading of the game from midfield, passing range and ferocious long-shots.

Club career
Born in Inhaca, Portuguese Mozambique, to a Portuguese father and a Mozambican mother, Coluna was spotted by S.L. Benfica while playing for Desportivo de Lourenço Marques, where he excelled at basketball and track and field. Signed by the Lisbon club in 1954, he started playing as an inside forward, scoring a career-best 14 goals in 26 games in his first season in Portugal and winning the first of his Primeira Liga championships; subsequently, he was successfully reconverted as a central or attacking midfielder by manager Otto Glória, where he put to good use his stamina and strength, adding to this an accurate and powerful long-distance shot and technical skills.

Coluna captained Benfica from 1963 to 1970, in 328 matches. Already at the service of Olympique Lyonnais, he was awarded a testimonial match by his main club on 8 December 1970, playing against a UEFA selection that featured the likes of Johan Cruyff, Dragan Džajić, Geoff Hurst, Bobby Moore, Uwe Seeler or Luis Suárez. He retired professionally at the age of 35, after one sole campaign with the French side – he still spent one year with amateurs Sport Clube Estrela from Portalegre, acting as player-coach.

Coluna scored in both European Cup finals won by Benfica: in 1961, he beat FC Barcelona's Antoni Ramallets from long range in a 3–2 win in Bern. The following year, against fellow Spaniards Real Madrid, he netted the 3–3 equaliser and, subsequently, was supposed to take the penalty that resulted in the 4–3 lead (eventual 5–3 triumph), when youngster Eusébio politely asked if he could shoot it instead.

International career
Coluna played 57 times for the Portugal national team, scoring eight goals. His first appearance was in a friendly with Scotland on 4 May 1955 (0–3 loss), and his last on 11 December 1968 in a 4–2 defeat in Greece for the 1970 FIFA World Cup qualifiers.

Coluna captained the Magriços side in all except one of the matches during the third-place campaign at the 1966 World Cup, in England.

Post-retirement / Death
After Mozambique became independent in 1975, Coluna held the post of President of its Football Federation. He also served as the country's Minister of Sports, from 1994 to 1999.

Coluna died on 25 February 2014 at the age of 78 in Maputo, after not being able to overcome a pulmonary infection.

Honours
Benfica
Primeira Liga: 1954–55, 1956–57, 1959–60, 1960–61, 1962–63, 1963–64, 1964–65, 1966–67, 1967–68, 1968–69
Taça de Portugal: 1954–55, 1956–57, 1958–59, 1961–62, 1963–64, 1968–69
European Cup: 1960–61, 1961–62
Intercontinental Cup runner-up: 1961, 1962

Portugal
FIFA World Cup third-place: 1966

Individual
World Soccer World XI: 1963, 1964, 1965, 1966
FIFA World Cup All-Star Team: 1966
FIFA XI: 1967

References

External links

 
 
 
 
 

1935 births
2014 deaths
People from Maputo Province
Colonial people in Mozambique
Mozambican emigrants to Portugal
Mozambican footballers
Portuguese footballers
Association football midfielders
Primeira Liga players
S.L. Benfica footballers
Ligue 1 players
Olympique Lyonnais players
UEFA Champions League winning players
Portugal international footballers
1966 FIFA World Cup players
Portuguese expatriate footballers
Expatriate footballers in France
Portuguese expatriate sportspeople in France
Culture ministers of Mozambique
Sports ministers of Mozambique